Father's Son is a 1941 American drama film directed by D. Ross Lederman and written by Fred Niblo Jr. and Booth Tarkington. The film stars John Litel, Frieda Inescort, Billy Dawson and Christian Rub. The film was released by Warner Bros. on February 12, 1941.

Cast
 John Litel as William Emory
 Frieda Inescort as Ruth Emory
 Billy Dawson as Bill Emory
 Christian Rub as Lunk Nelson

References

External links
 

1941 films
1941 drama films
American drama films
American black-and-white films
1940s English-language films
Warner Bros. films
Films based on works by Booth Tarkington
Films directed by D. Ross Lederman
1940s American films